The 13th Canadian Parliament was in session from March 18, 1918, until October 4, 1921.  The membership was set by the 1917 federal election on December 17, 1917, and it changed only somewhat due to resignations and by-elections until it was dissolved prior to the 1921 election.

It was controlled by a Unionist Party majority first under Prime Minister Sir Robert Borden and the 10th Canadian Ministry, and after July 10, 1920, by Prime Minister Arthur Meighen and the 11th Canadian Ministry.  The Official Opposition was the Laurier Liberal Party, led first by Wilfrid Laurier, and then by Daniel McKenzie and William Lyon Mackenzie King consecutively.

The Speaker was Edgar Nelson Rhodes.  See also List of Canadian electoral districts 1914-1924 for a list of the ridings in this parliament.

There were five sessions of the 13th Parliament; the third was opened by the Prince of Wales (later Edward VIII):

List of members

The following is a full list of members of the thirteenth Parliament listed first by province, then by electoral district. 

Electoral districts denoted by an asterisk (*) indicates that district was represented by two members.

Alberta

British Columbia

Manitoba

New Brunswick

Nova Scotia

Ontario

Prince Edward Island

Quebec

Saskatchewan

Yukon

By-elections

References

Succession

Canadian parliaments
1918 establishments in Canada
1921 disestablishments in Canada
1918 in Canada
1919 in Canada
1920 in Canada
1921 in Canada